The 1974 South African Grand Prix (formally the XX Lucky Strike Grand Prix of South Africa) was a Formula One motor race held at Kyalami on 30 March 1974. It was race 3 of 15 in both the 1974 World Championship of Drivers and the 1974 International Cup for Formula One Manufacturers. This was Carlos Reutemann's first win, the first for an Argentinian driver since Juan Manuel Fangio won the 1957 German Grand Prix, and Brabham's first since the 1970 South African Grand Prix.

Pre race notes, practice, and qualifying 
It was initially uncertain that the South African Grand Prix would go ahead due to the 1973 oil crisis, but it did so, albeit at the end of March rather than at the start of the month. Lotus stunned the paddock with an innovative car which used four pedals and an electric clutch.

However, practice was overshadowed by an accident which killed Peter Revson. While driving his Shadow-Ford in a test session before the race, Revson suffered a front suspension failure on the outside of Barbecue Bend and crashed heavily into the Armco barrier, the car bursting into flames. Revson died instantly, and the Shadow team withdrew from the race. Niki Lauda took pole by a fraction of a second from Carlos Pace.

Race summary 
The two Lotus cars of Ronnie Peterson and Jacky Ickx tangled shortly after the start with the incident also involving Jochen Mass and Henri Pescarolo whilst Tom Belsø's race lasted no more than a few hundred yards due to clutch failure. Lauda led a train of cars consisting of Carlos Reutemann, Clay Regazzoni, Jody Scheckter and James Hunt, whose Hesketh was suffering vibration problems.

Mike Hailwood caught and passed Scheckter when he missed a gear, and then passed Reutemann on lap 9. On lap 75, nearly at the finish, Lauda was forced to retire with ignition problems and low oil pressure, handing the lead to Reutemann. Jean-Pierre Beltoise fought his way up through the field to 2nd, holding off a determined challenge from Hailwood who took the final podium place. Beltoise's 2nd place would turn out to be the last podium finish for a BRM.

Classification

Qualifying

Race

Championship standings after the race

Drivers' Championship standings

Constructors' Championship standings

Note: Only the top five positions are included for both sets of standings.

References

South African Grand Prix
Grand Prix
South African Grand Prix
March 1974 sports events in Africa